Cliff Parisi (born Clifford R Manley; 24 May 1960) is an English actor, known for his roles as Minty Peterson in the BBC soap opera EastEnders and Fred Buckle in the BBC period drama Call the Midwife. In 2019, he participated in the nineteenth series of I'm a Celebrity...Get Me Out of Here!.

Career
Parisi began his career in 1982 when he started touring the United Kingdom as a stand-up comedian. He continued working as a stand-up comedian for a further seven years before being cast in the 1989 film Queen of Hearts. Parisi then appeared in television series such as The Bill, Chancer, Kavanagh QC, Bramwell and A Prince Among Men. He then auditioned for the role of Minty Peterson in the BBC soap opera EastEnders. His storylines in the series involved forming a close friendship with Garry Hobbs (Ricky Groves) and finding love with established characters Heather Trott (Cheryl Fergison) and Manda Best (Josie Lawrence). He made his final appearance on 21 September 2010.

In 2012, Parisi filmed a guest role in the Channel 4 soap opera Hollyoaks, playing the character of Walt. He also starred as a guest in the BBC drama Hustle, playing the character of Arnie. Since 2012, Parisi has starred in the BBC period drama Call the Midwife, appearing as Fred Buckle. In 2014, he appeared in the fifth and final series of the British sitcom Outnumbered, as  Ed Poll. In 2019, he participated in the nineteenth series of I'm a Celebrity...Get Me Out of Here! and was the third contestant to leave.

Personal life
Parisi has four children, one with his partner, BBC producer Tara Wyer, and three from previous relationships.

Filmography
Queen of Hearts (1989) - Manager
A Bit of Fry & Laurie (1990)
Can You Hear Me Thinking? (1990) - Biker
KYTV (1990, 1993)
Chancer (1990) - Lunchbox
The Pleasure Principle (1991) - Police Officer
Boon (1991) - John Preston
The Guilty (1992) - Cliff
Gone to Seed (1992) - Robin
Sean's Show (1992) - Police Officer
The Darling Buds of May (1993) - Bill Jackson
The Upper Hand (1993) - Gary
Bermuda Grace (1994) - Gary Foster
London's Burning (1994) - Mickey Wright
Drop the Dead Donkey (1994) - Paramedic
Under the Moon (1995) - Clifford
N7 (1995) - Alvin
Kavanagh QC (1995–2001) - Tom Buckley
Bramwell & Bramwell II (1995–1996) - Daniel Bentley
Glam Metal Detectives (1995) - Security Guard
Pie in the Sky (1996) - Inspector Dave Smith
A Prince Among Men (1997) - Dave Perry
The Man Who Knew Too Little (1997) - Uri
Our Boy (1997) - Jeff
The Saint (1997) - Pub Waiter
Paul Merton in Galton and Simpson's... (1997) - Sprott
Kiss Me Kate (1998) -  Tony
From Hell (2001) - Bartender
Hot Money (2001) - Bob Hoodless
Casualty (2000) - Paul Farrell
Sunburn (2000) - Reggie Roach
EastEnders (2002–2010) - Minty Peterson
Helen West (2002)
Bedtime (2002)
Waking the Dead (2003) - Tony King
The Bill (2003) - Anthony Spall
Hustle (2012) - Arnie
Call the Midwife (2012–present) - Fred Buckle
Hollyoaks (2012) - Walt
Outnumbered (2014) - Ed Poll
Plebs (2014) - Fulvio
I'm a Celebrity...Get Me Out of Here! (2019) – Himself
 All Those Small Things (2021) - Nick

References

External links

1960 births
20th-century English male actors
21st-century English male actors
English male film actors
English male soap opera actors
English people of Italian descent
I'm a Celebrity...Get Me Out of Here! (British TV series) participants
Living people
People from Hornsey